Tenali Rama is a 2006 Indian Kannada-language comedy film directed by Magadi Pandu and starring Ramesh Aravind and Jaggesh as the titular characters. The film released to positive reviews from critics and became a super hit.

Cast 
Ramesh Aravind as Tenali
Jaggesh as Rama
Komal
Rangayana Raghu
Dharma
Deepu
Santhoshi
Manasi

Production 
After the success of Honeymoon Express, director Tenali Rama and producer SV Babu teamed up again for this film.

Reception 
R. G. Vijayasarathy of Rediff.com opined that "Tenali Rama could have been a continuous laugh riot like the Malayalam original, but the script lets the film down. Ramesh and Jaggesh have tried their best to salvage the film, complementing each other very well". A critic from Indiaglitz said that "This is a first class comedy in the first half".

References 

2006 films
2000s Kannada-language films